Poettering may refer to:

Hans-Gert Pöttering (born 1945), German conservative politician
Lennart Poettering (born 1980), German software engineer